Harry Clifton Burrus Jr. (April 6, 1921 – September 20, 2004) was an American football halfback.

Burrus was born in Texas in 1921 and attended Big Spring High School in Big Spring, Texas, graduating in 1937. He played college football at Hardin–Simmons, graduating in 1941. While at Hardin-Simmons, he was selected as a Little All-American.

During World War II, he served in the Army Air Force, attained the rank of captain, and played on the Randolph Field Ramblers football team.

He played professional football in the All-America Football Conference for the New York Yankees in 1946 and 1947 and for the Chicago Cardinals and Brooklyn Dodgers in 1948. He appeared in 38 professional football games, nine of them as a starter, and tallied 28 receptions for 670 yards and four touchdowns. 

In 1949, he was hired by Washington University in St. Louis as an assistant professor of physical education and assistant football coach. He became athletic director at Washington University in 1958. He left Washington University in 1966 for a post at Parsons College in Fairfield, Iowa. He served as the tennis coach at Parsons.

He died in 2004 in Winter Haven, Florida.

References

1921 births
2004 deaths
American football halfbacks
New York Yankees (AAFC) players
Chicago Rockets players
Brooklyn Dodgers (NFL) players
Hardin–Simmons Cowboys football players
Players of American football from Texas
United States Army Air Forces personnel of World War II
United States Army Air Forces officers
Washington University in St. Louis faculty
Washington University Bears football coaches
Washington University Bears athletic directors